Richard Henry Piers Butler, 17th Viscount Mountgarret (8 November 1936 – 7 February 2004) was a British soldier.

Early life
Butler was born at Knaresborough, the son of Piers Butler, 16th Viscount Mountgarret and Eglantine Christie. He was educated at Eton and the Royal Military Academy, Sandhurst before joining the Irish Guards.

Career
He was commissioned into the Irish Guards in 1957, retiring in the rank of captain in 1964. Two years later he succeeded his father in the viscountcy, which had been created in 1550. After retiring from the Irish Guards, he was president of Yorkshire Cricket Club between 1984 and 1989. He moved to the  estate in South Stainley, near Ripon, after selling his family home, Nidd Hall, in the mid-1960s.

In 1997, on the death of Charles Butler, 7th Marquess of Ormonde, Mountgarret became the most likely heir to the Earldom of Ormond (created in 1328), and also to the 16th-century Earldom of Ossory, thus making him Chief Butler and Chief of the Butlers of Ireland, but as he submitted no claim to these Irish peerages they became dormant.

Marriages and children
Lord Mountgarret married three times. His first wife was Gillian Margaret Buckley, daughter of Cyril Francis Stewart Buckley and Audrey Burmester, on 20 May 1960 but divorced in 1970. The couple had two sons and a daughter:

 Piers James Richard Butler, 18th Viscount Mountgarret (15 April 1961)
 Married, Laura Brown Gary Williams (daughter of Albert Dickins Williams Jr, of Lake Forest, Ill., U.S.A.), in 1995 and divorced in 2000. 
 Hon Alexa Sterling Hadley Butler (b. 16 February 1997)
 Hon Morgan Dickins Somerset Butler (b. 14 May 1999)
 Then married Fenella M Fawcus, daughter of Mr and Mrs David Fawcus, on 30 December 2006.
 Hon Venetia Ellice Cara Butler (b. 25 September 2013)
 Hon. Theo Oliver Stafford Butler (b. 11 October 2015), the heir apparent.
 Hon. Edmund Henry Richard Butler (1 September 1962), married Adella I Lloyd, daughter of M. Lloyd, of New York City, in 1988 and was divorced in 1989. 
 Hon. Tara Sequoia Butler (b. 2 June 1997)  
 Hon Henrietta Elizabeth Alexandra Butler (1964), married Robert Cluer, son of Henry Cluer, in 1991.

Mountgarret later married Jennifer Susan Wills, a member of the Wills tobacco family, daughter of Capt. DM Wills, on 29 April 1970, but divorced in 1983. He finally married Angela Ruth Porter, eldest daughter of Major Thomas Porter, on 25 May 1983.

See also
Earl of Ormonde

References

 ThePeerage.com
 Obituary The Times
 Obituary The Telegraph
 Longespee 6

External links

1936 births
2004 deaths
Viscounts in the Peerage of Ireland
People educated at Eton College
Graduates of the Royal Military Academy Sandhurst
Irish Guards officers
People from Knaresborough
Presidents of Yorkshire County Cricket Club
Richard

Mountgarret